Amir Sayoud (born 30 September 1990) is an Algerian professional footballer who plays as an attacking midfielder for Saudi Professional League club Al-Tai.

Career

Youth career
Born in Guelma, Sayoud began his career in 2002 in the youth ranks of local club Nasr El Fedjoudj. He then played for Rapid de Guelma and ES Guelma before moving to ES Sétif.

While at Sétif, he saw a television commercial for try outs being held in Algiers for the 'Play Maker Academy' in Ismaïlia, Egypt. Of the 80 people trying out, Sayoud made the top 5 and was sent to train with 108 other players from the Arab world in Ismaïlia. After four months of training, only 35 players were chosen to stay, with Sayoud being among them. The remaining players continued training and participating in matches with Sayoud being chosen as the top player among the group.

He was approached by a number of clubs including Al-Ahly, Ismaily, Al-Ahli Dubai and Al Ain. Sayoud decided to join Al-Ahli Dubai, signing a 4-year contract with the club. During his brief time in the United Arab Emirates, his potential was quickly identified by Egyptian club Al-Ahly.

Al-Ahly

2009–2010: Senior debut 
On 23 June 2009, Al-Ahly announced the signing of Sayoud on a five-year contract. Al-Ahly were set to loan him out to Alexandria-based club Ittihad as the club was going to sign Moroccan striker Abdessalam Benjelloun, and the Egyptian Premier League sets a three-foreigner player quota for every team. With Gilberto and Francis Doe, the signature of Benjelloun would put the club over the limit. However, Al-Ahly decided to cancel the deal with Benjelloun and registered Sayoud in the squad list for the 2009–10 season.

He made his debut with the first team in the second league game against El Geish on 11 September 2009 coming on as a substitute for Francis Doe in the 75th minute. After only 10 minutes in his debut, he gained his first yellow card. After his debut, he commented on the important event in his playing career: "I'm really looking forward to playing again, I would like to thank the coaching staff for giving me this opportunity. I promise to repay their faith and live up to expectations."

2010: Loan to Al Arabi
On 26 January 2010, Sayoud was loaned out by Al-Ahly to Kuwaiti-side Al Arabi until the end of the season. He made six league appearances, scoring one goal. During his time with the club, he also helped Al Arabi reach the final of the 2010 Kuwait Crown Prince Cup where they lost to Kuwait SC.

2010–2011: Return to Al-Ahly 
At the end of the season, Sayoud returned to Al-Ahly where he received the number 31 shirt. On 4 November 2010, Sayoud played his second match for Al-Ahly against ENPPI Club as a substitute for Hossam Ghaly at the half-time.

2011: Loan to Al-Ismaily
On 15 September 2011, Sayoud was loaned out to Ismaily SC until the end of the season. On 20 September 2011, Sayoud made his debut for Ismaily as a second-half substitute in an Egyptian Cup match against Beni Suef, providing an assist for Mohamed Abougrisha on the 4th goal in a 4–0 Ismaily win.

In September 2012, Sayoud went on trial with German 2.Bundesliga side MSV Duisburg.

In July 2015, Sayoud signed with newly promoted Algerian Ligue Professionnelle 1 club DRB Tadjenanet.

International career
On 3 June 2011, Sayoud made his official debut for the Algeria national under-23 team in a 2012 Summer Olympics qualifier against Zambia. Sayoud started the game and delivered two assists as Algeria went on to win 3–0. On 16 November 2011, he was selected as part of Algeria's squad for the 2011 CAF U-23 Championship in Morocco.

Career statistics

Club

International

Honours
Ahly SC 
 Egyptian super cup: 2010–11

Beroe
 Bulgarian Cup: 2012–13
 Bulgarian Supercup: 2013

USM Alger
 Algerian Super Cup: 2016

CR Belouizdad
 Algerian Ligue Professionnelle 1: 2019–20, 2020–21
 Algerian Cup: 2019
 Algerian Super Cup: 2020

Algeria
FIFA Arab Cup: 2021

References

External links
 

Living people
1990 births
Algerian footballers
Algeria international footballers
Algeria youth international footballers
Algerian expatriate footballers
Algerian Ligue Professionnelle 1 players
First Professional Football League (Bulgaria) players
Algeria under-23 international footballers
Association football midfielders
ES Guelma players
ES Sétif players
Al Ahly SC players
Al Ahli Club (Dubai) players
Al-Arabi SC (Kuwait) players
Ismaily SC players
MC Alger players
PFC Beroe Stara Zagora players
DRB Tadjenanet players
USM Alger players
CR Belouizdad players
Al-Tai FC players
Egyptian Premier League players
Kuwait Premier League players
Saudi Professional League players
Expatriate footballers in the United Arab Emirates
Expatriate footballers in Egypt
Expatriate footballers in Kuwait
Expatriate footballers in Bulgaria
Expatriate footballers in Saudi Arabia
Algerian expatriate sportspeople in the United Arab Emirates
Algerian expatriate sportspeople in Egypt
Algerian expatriate sportspeople in Kuwait
Algerian expatriate sportspeople in Bulgaria
Algerian expatriate sportspeople in Saudi Arabia
2011 CAF U-23 Championship players
People from Guelma
21st-century Algerian people